Trevor John Zeltner (born 8 April 1951) is a former Australian rules footballer who played with Footscray in the Victorian Football League (VFL). He left Footscray in 1973 to play for Acton and became senior coach the following season.

Sources

Holmesby, Russell & Main, Jim (2007). The Encyclopedia of AFL Footballers. 7th ed. Melbourne: Bas Publishing.

External links

1951 births
Living people
Australian rules footballers from Victoria (Australia)
Western Bulldogs players
Sale Football Club players
Acton Football Club players